The Eger Synagogue was a Jewish Synagogue in Eger, Hungary.

History 
The Eger Synagogue was built between 1911 and 1913 on the corner of what is now known as Hibay Károly Street and Kossuth Lajos Street in Eger, Hungary. The building was officially inaugurated on September 13, 1913. The synagogue was designed by Lipót Baumhorn, who worked in the late Eclectic-Art Nouveau style. The form and style were typical of Baumhorn's synagogue architecture, and it bore similarities to the Szeged New Synagogue and the Novi Sad Synagogue.

Because of the devastation of the Holocaust and World War II on the local Jewish community, the synagogue became unable to function. Following the war, the building was sold to the Eger city council, which used it as a warehouse. It was destroyed in 1967 and no longer exists.

The Hotel Unicornis, named for the unicorn in the Eger coat of arms, stands on the site today.

References 

 (szerk.) Gerő László: Magyarországi zsinagógák, Műszaki Könyvkiadó, Budapest, 1989, 152. o.
 https://ntf.hu/index.php/2017/10/06/muemlekvedelmi-rombolas-eger-belvarosaban/
 http://mnl.gov.hu/mnl/hml/hirek/es_keszitsetek_szamomra_szentelyt_hogy_kozottuk_lakozzam_volt_egyszer_egy_egri

External links 
 http://magyarzsido.hu/index.php?option=com_catalogue&view=detail&id=94&Itemid=20

Former synagogues in Hungary
Synagogues completed in 1913
Destroyed synagogues